Bidston is a suburb of Birkenhead, Wirral, Merseyside, England. It contains 23 buildings that are recorded in the National Heritage List for England as designated listed buildings. Of these, three are listed at Grade II*, the middle of the three grades, and the others are at Grade II, the lowest grade.

Bidston originated as a village, and later became absorbed by the growth of Birkenhead. The centre of the village retains older buildings, including four farmhouses and associated farm buildings that are all listed. Also listed is Bidston Hall and associated structures. In addition the list includes almshouses, and two churches, one in the village, and one in the outskirts of the suburb. To the east of the village is Bidston Hill which contains four listed buildings, namely an observatory, a lighthouse and cottages, the wall surrounding them, and a windmill.

Key

Buildings

References

Citations

Sources

Listed buildings in Merseyside
Lists of listed buildings in Merseyside